Munidopsis andamanica is a species of squat lobster that lives in the deep sea and eats dead wood. It has long chelipeds (claw-bearing legs), which are twice as long as the carapace.

References 

Squat lobsters
Crustaceans described in 1905